(lit. "The Prince and the Mermaid") is an animated series produced by Fuji Television and Saban International Paris in the early 1990s, based on the 1837 Hans Christian Andersen fairy tale "The Little Mermaid".

This 26-episode TV series was originally created by Jean Chalopin and directed by Takehiro Miyano. The series was broadcast on Japan's Fuji TV network from February to July 1991. As in the 1975 feature-length film version produced by Toei, Hans Christian Andersen's The Little Mermaid (with which this series may be confused), the mermaid protagonist was drawn as a blonde in this version and given the name Marina. It also added a new ingredient to the story: a magic potion given to the prince which he could use to breathe underwater and be with Marina. 26 episodes were produced.

Released in America for Saturday morning and weekday afternoon syndication by Saban Entertainment in association with USA syndicator Bohbot Entertainment in the summer of 1991, intended to capitalize on the success of the Disney film adaptation of the same story. Disney coincidentally released their own TV series adaptation, which did far better than Saban's in the ratings.

Ownership of the series passed to Disney in 2001 when Disney acquired Fox Kids Worldwide, which also includes Saban Entertainment. The series is not available on Disney+.

Plot
Marina is a mermaid who is in love with Prince Justin, a human prince from a kingdom on the shore. Marina saves Justin when he almost drowns after a chase from a giant Cyclops and a shipwreck attack from a three-headed sea serpent. She then makes a deal with Hedwig the sea witch to become human temporarily to try to win Justin's love. Justin and Marina become close but Justin thinks that Princess Cecily, a human princess, was the one who saved him from drowning and therefore he gets engaged to her. Justin eventually remembers that Marina was the one who saved his life but by then Marina becomes a mermaid again. The two continue to secretly meet and try to find a way to be together while dealing with Hedwig's plans to take over the kingdom and Cecily's attempts to get Justin to marry her. Marina and Justin are aided by their underwater friends Winnie the seahorse, Bobo the tropical fish, and Ridley the sea otter. They are also aided by the wizard Anselm and by Chauncey, Justin's page.

Characters

Main
 Marina (voiced by Sonja Ball): A mermaid with waist-length golden blonde hair and green tail who is the protagonist of the show. After she saves Prince Justin of Gandor she falls in love with him and wishes to become human.
 Prince Justin (voiced by Thor Bishopric): Prince of Gandor and Marina's boyfriend.
 Winnie (voiced by Anik Matern): Marina's seahorse friend and constant companion. Unlike real world seahorses, she has the ability to scream at very high pitches which causes people to pass out. She also has the ability to fly when she is out of water.
 Bobo (voiced by Carlyle Miller): Marina's tropical fish friend. He often spies on Hedwig and reports back to Marina and the rest of the gang.
 Ridley (voiced by Arthur Holden): Marina's sea otter friend and Anselm's companion. Unlike real world sea otters, he seems to be able to breathe under water indefinitely.
 Anselm (voiced by Aron Tager): Prince Justin's tutor and secretly a sorcerer who was once in love with Hedwig in their youth.
 Chauncey (voiced by Gordon Masten): Prince Justin's short, goofy and loyal page.

Antagonists
 Hedwig the Sea Witch (voiced by Sonja Ball): The sea witch who acts as the main antagonist of the show. She was once a sorceress who was in love with Anselm until her hunger for power forced him to banish her to the sea. She comes up with plot after plot to capture Marina and Justin so she can exchange them for the Amulet of Power which would make her the most powerful person on both land and water and therefore rule the world. Just like a mermaid, she doesn't have legs and her tail resembles that of a moray eel. The power that she uses most often is to release prehensile vines from her long fingernails.
 Dudley (voiced by Ian Finlay): Hedwig's halfwitted hammerhead shark second-in-command. His role is a lot more prominent than the other henchmen of Hedwig and he serves as the comic relief among the antagonists.
 Ray: Hedwig's manta ray. He acts as her means of transport and spy. He is heard speaking sometimes but other times he is shown to only be able to mumble (though Hedwig can understand him even then). It's not clear what his name is as Hedwig once calls him Ray and another time she calls him Manta.
 Hugo: Hedwig's octopus who acts as her strongman.
Barracudas & Bull Sharks: Hedwig's army
 Cecily: A mean aristocratic girl who likes Prince Justin even though he doesn't reciprocate her feelings. She was his promised bride before he met Marina. Her father is Lord Ainsworth.
 Prince Lothar (voiced by Richard Dumont): Prince of Brakston (Gandor's enemy country) and Justin's sworn enemy. He often cooperates with Hedwig.

Supporting
 Barnabas: Marina's cousin. He is a very good inventor and his tail is blue.
 Coral: Marina's bossy older sister. Her tail is pink.
 King Nestor: King of the world's oceans. King Nestor is extremely strong as can be seen when he easily beats Hugo with his bare hands. His tail is dark blue.
 Marina's grandmother: She lives in the same castle as Marina. She is seen briefly in two episodes and her voice can be heard in another one.
 King Charles (voiced by A. J. Henderson): Prince Justin's father.
 Queen Catherine (voiced by Kathleen Fee): Prince Justin's mother. She is very interested in her son's love life and tries to act as his matchmaker.
 Orcus: A whale who helps Marina and her friends a few times.

Episodes
 Return to the Sea
 In the Wrong Hands
 Water Water Everywhere
 A Leopard and Her Spots
 Lothar's Revenge
 What's Cookin'?
 Be Careful What You Wish
 A Day In the Country
 Safe Deposit
 Sugar and Spice
 A Friend Indeed
 Song of the Sea Witch
 The Valley of the Volcanoes
 Quest for the Golden Tablet
 A Case of Mistaken Identity
 Beauty and the Beastly Prince
 A Man's Beast Friend Is His Dogfish
 A Mortal In Mermaid's Clothing
 Nature Hike
 My Bonnie Lies Under the Sea
 The Trojan Seahorse
 A Rose By Any Other Name
 X Marks the Spot
 One Man's Bread Is Another Man's Poison
 Hold That Thought
 Waste Not, Want Not

Music
The series uses two pieces of theme music for the original Japanese version. The opening theme is called "Yumemiru Mermaid (夢みるMERMAID lit. Dreaming Mermaid)" and the ending theme is called "Pearl-no Kimochi (パールな気持ち lit. Pearl Feelings)", both by vocalist Yumi Hiroki, who also portrayed the voice of Winnie in the Japanese version of the show. Rachelle Cano performs the theme music for the English dub version.

Music from the English version was used for the English dub of Digimon Adventure.

References

External links
 
 

1991 anime television series debuts
Anime and manga based on fairy tales
Fuji TV original programming
Mermaids in television
Television series created by Jean Chalopin
Television series by Saban Entertainment
Television shows based on The Little Mermaid
Witchcraft in television
Adventure anime and manga
Fantasy anime and manga
Romance anime and manga